The Sirius 28 is a Canadian sailboat, that was designed by Hubert Vandestadt and first built in 1982. The design is out of production.

The designer, Hubert Vandestadt, is the nephew of Dutch boat designer Ericus Gerhardus van de Stadt.

Production
The boat was built by Vandestadt and McGruer Ltd in Owen Sound, Ontario, Canada between 1982 and 1987, with 120 examples completed.

Design

The Sirius 28 is a small recreational keelboat, built predominantly of fibreglass, with wood trim. It has a masthead sloop rig, an internally-mounted spade-type rudder and a fixed fin keel. It displaces  and carries  of ballast.

The boat has a PHRF racing average handicap of 192 with a high of 199 and low of 189.

See also
List of sailing boat types

Similar sailboats
Alerion Express 28
Aloha 28
Beneteau First 285
Beneteau Oceanis 281
Bristol Channel Cutter
Cal 28
Catalina 28
Cumulus 28
Grampian 28
Hunter 28
Hunter 28.5
Hunter 280
O'Day 28
Pearson 28
Sabre 28
Sea Sprite 27
Tanzer 8.5
Tanzer 28
TES 28 Magnam
Viking 28

References

External links

Keelboats
1980s sailboat type designs
Sailing yachts
Sailboat type designs by Hubert Vandestadt
Sailboat types built by Vandestadt and McGruer Limited